Resistance is a 1992 Australian film set in the future in a military dictatorship.

References

External links

Resistance at Oz Movies
Resistance at Sci-Fi movies

Australian action films
1992 films
1990s English-language films
1990s Australian films